is a district located in Hiroshima Prefecture, Japan.

As of 2020, the district has an estimated population of 15,125 and a density of 54.38 persons per km2. The total area is 278.1 km2.

Towns and villages
Sera

Merger
On October 1, 2004 all three towns in the district merged into the single expanded town of Sera.  The other two former towns were Kōzan and Seranishi.

References

Districts in Hiroshima Prefecture